Poyang County is a county under the administration of Shangrao city in the northeast of Jiangxi Province of the People's Republic of China, bordering Anhui Province to the north.  It is located on the eastern side of Lake Poyang.

History
The area was known as Po under the Chu state during the Warring States period. Under the Qin, the area was organized as Poyang County and placed under the administration of Jiujiang. Po was entrusted to the Yue leader Wu Rui. During the collapse of Qin, he allied first with Xiang Yu and then with Liu Bei, becoming successively the king of Hengshan and then Changsha. Under the Han, the area was known as Poyang and placed under the administration of Yuzhang. It kept the same name but changed its first character to the present one under the Western Han.

During Eastern Han, the Yangtze River flowed farther north and Poyang constituted a wide and fertile lowland. Around , the Yangtze changed its course to the south and flooded the district which has ever since comprised Poyang Lake. Many of its people fled as refugees into neighboring districts.

In 1957, the name of the county was changed to Boyang County, but in December 2003 the original name was restored. On May 27, 2014, Poyang County was designated as directly-controlled county by the provincial government as a part of a pilot program in Jiangxi Province.

Administrative divisions
Poyang County administers 14 towns and 20 rural townships.  The county seat is the town of Poyang. Around 1998 the county had approximately 1 million people.
 The town of Poyang had around 1998.
 The Yinhaobu Township had about 20,000 people around 1998. It includes the Guantian Village Committee.
 The Guantian Village Committee consists of the villages of Cao, Gao, and Xu.
 In 1997 Gao Village had 351 residents, including people who left the village as migrant workers. Gao Village has a local school that was established in 1969, during the Cultural Revolution. Mobo C. F. Gao, author of the book Gao Village said that around 1995 almost all of the village's children have had two years of education because of the existence of the village school. Gao also said that the school would not have been established if it had not been for the Cultural Revolution. During the Cultural Revolution almost all of the children, including the girls, had an elementary school education spanning three years due to the convenience of having a local school and low costs. Before 1949 no intra-village marriages occurred in Gao Village. Before the Cultural Revolution there was one intra-village marriage, which also was zhaozhui marriage; a zhaozhui marriage, in which the groom lives with the bride's family, was considered to have a stigma during the pre-Cultural Revolution time and still had some stigma in 1995 since area people believed that only extremely pool, helpless, hopeless, and parentless people entered zhaozhui marriages. Since the Cultural Revolution eight intra-village marriages occurred in Gao Village.

In the present, Yanling County has 14 towns and 15 townships.
14 towns

15 townships

Geography

Province Yang county is located in east longitude 116 ° to 117 ° 23 '45 "06' 15 ', north latitude 28 ° 46 '26, and 29 ° 42' 03", between the north border with penzer county and east to county in anhui province; The border with yugan, wannian; East in jingdezhen, leping neighbours; With duchang county are linked by mountains and rivers and northwest. By 2014, the province Yang county jurisdiction covers an area of 4215 square kilometers, the water area of 948.7 square kilometers, accounting for 22.5%, therefore has the "China lake city" reputation. The northern portion of the county is mountainous, while Lake Poyang can be found in the west.  The center of the county is home to the Lake Poyang Plains.

Climate

Transportation

The Jiujing Highway passes through the northern portion of the county.  In total, there are 209 provincial roads in the county. The county is served by Poyang railway station on the Jiujiang–Quzhou railway.

Famous people

Hong Mai
Jiang Kui

References
 Gao, Mobo C. F. "Gao Village: Modern Life in Rural China." University of Hawaii Press, 1995. Google Books

Notes

 
Shangrao
County-level divisions of Jiangxi